The men's javelin throw event at the 1983 Pan American Games was held in Caracas, Venezuela on 28 August. It was the last time that men used the old model javelin at the Games.

Results

References

Athletics at the 1983 Pan American Games
1983